Satkul (also referred to as Satkui) is a village, in the Kharagpur I CD block in the Kharagpur subdivision of the Paschim Medinipur district in the state of West Bengal, India.

Geography

Location

Area overview
Kharagpur subdivision, shown partly in the map alongside, mostly has alluvial soils, except in two CD blocks in the west – Kharagpur I and Keshiary, which mostly have lateritic soils. Around 74% of the total cultivated area is cropped more than once. With a density of population of 787 per km2nearly half of the district’s population resides in this subdivision. 14.33% of the population lives in urban areas and 86.67% lives in the rural areas.

Note: The map alongside presents some of the notable locations in the subdivision. All places marked in the map are linked in the larger full screen map.

Demographics
As per 2011 Census of India Satkul had a total population of 3,559 of which 1,831 (51%) were males and 1,768 (49%) were females. Population below 6 years was 578. The total number of literates in Satkul was 2,336 (64.91% of the population over 6 years).

.* For language details see Kharagpur I#Language and religion

Civic administration

CD block HQ
The headquarters of Kharagpur I CD block are located at Satkul.

Transport
NH 14 connecting Morgram (in Murshidabad district) and Kharagpur (in Paschim Medinipur district) passes through Satkul.

References

Villages in Paschim Medinipur district